Andrew Cross (born 13 April 1961) is a former Australian rules footballer who played with St Kilda, Fitzroy and Richmond in the Victorian Football League (VFL).  

Cross, a rover, was recruited locally and made his league debut in 1979. He appeared just twice in 1980 and then didn't play senior VFL football in either of the next two seasons. When he returned in 1983, he played the best football of his career, averaging 20 disposals and kicking 14 goals from his eight games. The following year he made more regular appearances, playing 15 games.

He finished his career with one seasons stints at both Fitzroy and Richmond. At Fitzroy, he missed just three games all year and then crossed to Richmond. Despite commanding a high transfer fee, he played just once for his new club.

Cross also played for VFA club Frankston under the coaching of Jeff Sarau.

References

1961 births
Living people
Australian rules footballers from Victoria (Australia)
St Kilda Football Club players
Fitzroy Football Club players
Richmond Football Club players